Neobouteloua is a genus of Argentine and Chilean plants in the grass family.

 Species
 Neobouteloua lophostachya (Griseb.) Gould - Chile, Argentina (Catamarca, Córdoba, Salta, Tucumán, La Rioja, San Luis, Mendoza, Santiago del Estero)
 Neobouteloua pauciracemosa M.G.López & Biurrun -  Argentina (La Rioja, San Luis)

References

Chloridoideae
Poaceae genera
Grasses of South America
Grasses of Argentina